Pentti Aatos Kahma (December 3, 1943 Alavieska) is a retired discus thrower from Finland, who is best known for winning the title at the 1974 European Championships in Rome, Italy. He represented his native country at the 1976 Summer Olympics in Montreal, Quebec, Canada.

References
 1975 year ranking

External links 

1943 births
Living people
People from Alavieska
Finnish male discus throwers
Athletes (track and field) at the 1972 Summer Olympics
Athletes (track and field) at the 1976 Summer Olympics
Olympic athletes of Finland
European Athletics Championships medalists
Sportspeople from North Ostrobothnia